The Beaumont Children's Museum is a children's museum temporarily located in the Beaumont Civic Center in Beaumont, Texas.

The museum is part of a concentration of several museums in the downtown Beaumont area. It is located across the street from the Tyrrell Historical Library, Art Museum of Southeast Texas and the Texas Energy Museum. The Edison Museum and Fire Museum of Texas are within a few blocks.

History
The museum started in 2008 as a 501(c)(3) nonprofit organization.  The museum opened for exhibits in 2010 as a "museum without walls".  In 2012, a lease was acquired for a site at the corner of Neches and Crockett streets in downtown Beaumont.  The building was later condemned and removed.  Following condemnation and subsequent removal of the building, the museum continued operations as a "museum without walls". It moved to its current temporary home, the Beaumont Civic Center in 2014 opening for exhibits in the summer of 2015.  The main entrance to the museum is located on the north side of the civic center.

Features

Permanent exhibits
Permanent exhibits include:
 STUFFEE, a seven-foot ambassador of health.
 Lego Stations designed to teach children STEM skills
 Simple and mechanized machines
 Stability Station
 Drop Build
 Sky Spot
 Toddler Spot
 Our Town Exhibit
 Grocery Store
 Bank
 Medical Clinic

Activities
In addition to exhibits, the museum sponsors several activities throughout the year as well as summer camps. For example, 2015 events include:
 Dia de los Muertos - Trick or treat coupled with art and culture
 Halloween Week
 Camps throughout the summer offering field trips as well as activities at the museum
 Touch a Truck - offering children an opportunity to touch and explore their favorite truck

References

External links
 

Children's museums in Texas
Museums in Beaumont, Texas
Museums established in 2008